Haute Living is a luxury lifestyle magazine founded in 2004.  It is based in Miami, Florida, and as of 2015 is chaired by Robert Farmer. The executive publishers of the magazine are Kamal Hotchandani, CEO, and Seth Semilof, COO.

The magazine is published by Haute Living, Inc., and distributed on a bi-monthly basis in New York City, Los Angeles, Miami, and San Francisco.

Content
Haute Living covers interviews on entrepreneurs of great influence, business magnates, celebrities, and people of important standing in society.  The magazine also covers reviews on luxury products such as private jets, mega yachts, supercars, jewelry, and timepieces. The magazine's online component, HauteLiving.com, provides a web-based version of the magazine to its readers.

Online version
The online version of the publication covers the cities of New York, Los Angeles, San Francisco, Miami, Las Vegas, Dubai, London, Boston, and Dallas. The United States as a whole is covered in a more universal way under the "National" heading.

Distribution model
Haute Living is distributed to flights on private jets and direct-mailed to subscribers in the United States.  Internationally, the magazine is placed in private airports, building lobbies, and luxury hotels.

Demographics
The median age of a Haute Living reader is slightly over 49 years of age with over 96% owning their primary residence with an average value of over $10 million.

References

External links 
 

Lifestyle magazines published in the United States
Magazines established in 2004
Magazines published in Florida
Mass media in Miami
Bimonthly magazines published in the United States
2004 establishments in Florida